Federer is a Swiss surname. According to Sandi Toksvig on the "quills" episode of QI, "Federer" means (in Swiss German) one who works with or trades in quills, which are traditionally made from feathers. 

Federer may refer to:
The Federer family of Berneck, St. Gallen
Barbara Schmid-Federer (born 1965), Swiss politician
Edi Federer (1955–2012), Austrian ski jumper
Herbert Federer (1920–2010), American mathematician
Heinrich Federer (1866–1928), Swiss writer and Catholic priest
Michelle Federer (born 1973), American theatre and film actress
Mirka Federer (born 1978), former WTA tennis player and wife of Roger Federer
Oskar Federer (1884–1968), Czech industrialist
Roger Federer (born 1981), Swiss tennis player
Urban Federer (born 1968), Swiss Roman Catholic abbot

Swiss-German surnames